Cai Shu may refer to:

 Shu Du of Cai, first ruler of the State of Cai
 Cai Shu (athlete) (born 1962), Chinese retired high jumper